Ariful Haque (born 18 November 1992) is a Bangladeshi cricketer. He made his first-class cricket debut in the 2006/07 season and made his international debut for the Bangladesh cricket team in February 2018.

Domestic career
Ariful made his first-class debut for Barisal Division in the 2006/07 season.

Ariful was the leading wicket-taker for Central Zone in the 2017–18 Bangladesh Cricket League, with sixteen dismissals in six matches.

In October 2018, Ariful scored his maiden double-century in first-class cricket, batting for Rangpur Division in the 2018–19 National Cricket League. Later the same month, he was named in the squad for the Khulna Titans team, following the draft for the 2018–19 Bangladesh Premier League. In August 2019, he was one of 35 cricketers named in a training camp ahead of Bangladesh's 2019–20 season. In November 2019, he was selected to play for the Dhaka Platoon in the 2019–20 Bangladesh Premier League.

International career
In February 2018, Ariful was named in Bangladesh's Twenty20 International (T20I) squad for their series against Sri Lanka. He made his T20I debut for Bangladesh against Sri Lanka on 15 February 2018.

In August 2018, Ariful was one of twelve debutants to be selected for a 31-man preliminary squad for Bangladesh ahead of the 2018 Asia Cup. Later that month, he was named in Bangladesh's fifteen-man squad for the tournament, but he did not play.

In October 2018, Ariful was named in Bangladesh's One Day International (ODI) and Test squads for their series against Zimbabwe. He made his ODI debut for Bangladesh against Zimbabwe on 26 October 2018. He made his Test debut for Bangladesh, also against Zimbabwe, on 3 November 2018.

References

External links
 
 Ariful Haque at Twitter

1984 births
Living people
Bangladeshi cricketers
Bangladesh Test cricketers
Bangladesh One Day International cricketers
Bangladesh Twenty20 International cricketers
Barisal Division cricketers
Rajshahi Royals cricketers
Rangpur Division cricketers
Comilla Victorians cricketers
Mohammedan Sporting Club cricketers
Khelaghar Samaj Kallyan Samity cricketers
Bangladesh North Zone cricketers
Chattogram Challengers cricketers
Bangladesh under-23 cricketers
Khulna Tigers cricketers
People from Rangpur District
Rupganj Tigers Cricket Club cricketers
South Asian Games gold medalists for Bangladesh
South Asian Games medalists in cricket